Peronina is a genus of air-breathing sea slugs, a shell-less marine pulmonate gastropod mollusks in the family Onchidiidae.

Species
Two species are accepted within the genus Peronina:

 Peronina tenera (Stoliczka, 1869)
Peronina zulfigari Goulding & Dayrat, 2018

References

Onchidiidae